Bijan Daneshmand (born 16 August 1958) is an Iranian born-English actor and artist based in London, England.

Early life and education
Bijan Daneshmand was born in Tehran, Iran. At the age of 10, he moved to England to receive his early education. After graduating from King's College London, he attended the London Centre for Theatre Studies and the Philippe Gaulier School in Paris to develop his acting skills. Later, he obtained an MA from Chelsea College of Arts.

Career
In 2004, Daneshmand produced and acted in 20 Fingers, a feature film, directed and acted by Mania Akbari. In seven scenes shot by Touraj Aslani with a DV camera in a variety of long takes, the director and producer play a couple or potentially several couples who debate and argue about their relationship. The film tackles taboo subjects, including homosexuality and divorce. It premiered at the 61st Venice International Film Festival in 2004, where it won the Best Digital Film, Venezia Digitale.

In 2006, Daneshmand wrote and directed the avant-garde film, A Snake's Tail. The Bare Bones International Film Festival in Oklahoma, United States, named this film the Best International Feature, and it was also included at the Festival Do Rio and the Frankfurt International Film Festival.

In 2009, Daneshmand starred in a film, Women Without Men, directed by Shirin Neshat and Shoja Azari, and is based on the 1990 novel by Shahrnush Parsipur. Gender-related issues in Islam and the Muslim world are discussed in the film. It received the 2009 Venice Film Festival's Silver Lion for best director.

In 2011, Daneshmand starred in a short film Two & Two as a male teacher, which was directed by Babak Anvari, co-produced by Kit Fraser, and written by Babak Anvari and Gavin Cullen. The 8-minute film follows Daneshmand's character, a male teacher, as he introduces the statement 2 + 2 = 5 to his young pupils. In 2011, at the British Academy of Film and Television Arts, BAFTA, it was nominated for Best Short Film.

In 2016, Daneshmand plays the role of university director in Under the Shadow, a 2016 Persian-language psychological horror film directed by Babak Anvari. A mother and daughter had terrifying supernatural encounters in Tehran during the Iran-Iraq War of the 1980s. The film's world debut took place at the Sundance Film Festival in 2016. In 2017, it was awarded with the BAFTA for Outstanding Debut.

In 2021, Daneshmand wrote and directed a Persian-language web series, The Bahramis.

In 2022, Daneshmand was cast as a AliReza Jamshidpour, one of the leading characters in Maryam Keshavarz's film The Persian Version. The film was premiered at the 2023 Sundance Film Festival in January 2023 as part of the U.S. Dramatic competition. It took home the Waldo for Best Screenplay as well as the Audience Award.

Daneshmand, parallel with his acting, is engaged with his fine art practice. His artwork has been exhibited and reviewed internationally at art galleries, exhibitions, and publications.

In 1996, Daneshmand founded and launched The Leonard, an award winning boutique hotel in central London. The hotel was popular with musicians and film people. William Orbit made various recordings there including works involving U2, Madonna, Pink. In 2003, Daneshmand sold his family interest in the business, to focus entirely on his art and acting.

In 2020, he commenced his Damavand series; a collection of over 150 works, an exploration on the theme of repetition and difference.

Selected filmography

Film

Television

Radio

Awards and recognition
 2004: Venice Film Festival, 20 Fingers, received Best Film Venezia Cinema Digitale, Bijan Daneshmand was the producer.
 2006: Bare Bones International Film Festival, A Snake's Tail, Winner Best International Feature, Bijan Daneshmand was the writer and director.
 2021: IndieFEST Film Awards, The Bahramis, received Award of Merit Best Web Series and Award of Excellence Lead Actor, Bijan Daneshmand was the director.
 2021: BUEIFF Web Series Film Festival, The Bahramis, received Best Actor, Bijan Daneshmand.

References

External links

Bijan Daneshmand's interview with Lisa Pollman
Bijan Daneshmand on iranian.com

1958 births
Alumni of King's College London
British male actors of Asian descent
Iranian emigrants to the United Kingdom
English male film actors
Iranian male film actors
Living people
People educated at Eastbourne College
Male actors from London
Male actors from Tehran
Iranian diaspora film people